Adam Cheyer (born c. 1966) is a co-founder of Siri Inc. and formerly a director of engineering in the iPhone group at Apple.

Early life and education
Cheyer attended Sharon High School, in Sharon, Massachusetts. After graduating in 1984, Cheyer earned a bachelor's degree in computer science from Brandeis University in 1988, and a master's degree in computer science and artificial intelligence from UCLA in 1993.

Career
Prior to Siri, he was a computer scientist and project director in SRI International's Artificial Intelligence Center, where he was the Chief Architect on the CALO project. Cheyer was also a member of the founding team at Change.org and a founder of Sentient Technologies (formerly Genetic Finance).

Adam left the Siri team in 2012 and founded Viv Labs, which was acquired by Samsung in 2016.

Selected publications

References

External links
 Official website
 Adam Cheyer Keynote Speaker Bio Page
 A patent in speech assistance Personalized vocabulary for digital assistant, published Dec 2, 2014 (Google Patents website)

Living people
SRI International people
Apple Inc. employees
Artificial intelligence researchers
Brandeis University alumni
University of California, Los Angeles alumni
1966 births